David Schlemko (born May 7, 1987) is a Canadian former professional ice hockey defenceman who played eleven seasons in the National Hockey League (NHL).

Playing career
Schlemko played junior hockey for the Medicine Hat Tigers of the Western Hockey League from 2004 until 2007. He was a member of the Tigers' WHL championship team in 2007. Undrafted, Schlemko was signed as a free agent on July 19, 2007, by the Coyotes to a three-year entry-level contract and was assigned to the Central Hockey League's Arizona Sundogs. In 2008, Schlemko was assigned to the San Antonio Rampage. He made his NHL debut with the Coyotes during the 2008–09 season, playing a total of 3 games scoring 1 assist. His first career NHL goal was scored on November 14, 2009, against Marty Turco of the Dallas Stars.

During the 2012–13 NHL lockout, Schlemko played 14 games for the Arizona Sundogs of the Central Hockey League (CHL).

In the 2014–15 season, on January 3, 2015, Schlemko was claimed off waivers by the Dallas Stars. Schlemko played in 5 scoreless games with the Stars as a reserve defenseman before he was again placed and claimed off waivers by the Calgary Flames on March 1, 2015.

As a free agent on September 10, 2015, Schlemko joined his fourth organization within a year by signing a one-year contract with the New Jersey Devils. As a late free-agent addition to the Devils, Schlemko surprised in the 2015–16 season, to solidify his role on the blueline and record a career-high 6 goals and 19 points in 67 games.

On July 1, 2016, Schlemko was rewarded from his tenure with the Devils by signing a four-year contract as a free agent with the San Jose Sharks. In the 2016–17 season, Schlemko solidified the Sharks blueline, appearing in 62 games in matching his previous season 6 goals while contributing with 18 points.

Schlemko's tenure with the Sharks was limited to one season as he was selected by the Vegas Golden Knights in the 2017 NHL Expansion Draft on June 21, 2017. The following day, the Golden Knights promptly dealt him to the Montreal Canadiens in exchange for a fifth-round draft pick in 2019. Schlemko missed the beginning of the 2017–18 season with the Canadiens after breaking his hand on his first day of training camp with the club. Nearing a return from injury, Schlemko played one game on a conditioning stint with AHL affiliate, the Laval Rocket, before suffering a setback in requiring surgery to remove bone fragments in his hand on October 19, 2017. Schlemko missed the first 25 games of the season before returning to make 37 appearances and adding 1 goal and four assists.

For a second consecutive year, Schlemko was placed on the injured reserve list to begin the 2018–19 season, after injuring his knee in a pre-season game on September 29, 2018. Schlemko returned to action to appear in 18 games on the blueline for the Canadiens for 2 assists before he was placed on waivers and demoted to the Laval Rocket on January 8, 2019. Schlemko registered 4 points in 8 games for the Rockets before he was traded by the Canadiens with Byron Froese to the Philadelphia Flyers in exchange for Dale Weise and Christian Folin on February 9, 2019. Schlemko reported directly to AHL affiliate, the Lehigh Valley Phantoms, and played out the remainder of the regular season to appear in 18 games for 4 assists.

On June 30, 2019, Schlemko was placed on unconditional waivers by the Flyers in order to buy out the remaining year on his contract.

Career statistics

Awards and honours

References

External links
 

1987 births
Arizona Coyotes players
Arizona Sundogs players
Calgary Flames players
Canadian ice hockey defencemen
Dallas Stars players
Laval Rocket players
Lehigh Valley Phantoms players
Living people
Medicine Hat Tigers players
Montreal Canadiens players
New Jersey Devils players
Phoenix Coyotes players
Portland Pirates players
San Antonio Rampage players
San Jose Sharks players
Ice hockey people from Edmonton
Undrafted National Hockey League players